An unusually large south Atlantic storm struck the southern coast of South Africa on 7 June 2017 with wind speeds as high as 120 km/h.  Wave heights of 9–12 metres were recorded  between Cape Columbine and Cape Agulhas. The storm directly caused eight deaths and damaged 135 schools across the Western Cape. Around 800 homes were flooded across the city of Cape Town due to the storm.

Despite dropping up to 50 mm of rain the storm did not break the Cape Town water crisis affecting the region.

Knysna fires 

High winds of 50 km/h caused by the storm fueled around 20 to 30 significant fires that swept through the town of Knysna and surrounding areas in the days after the storm.  The fires killed seven people and displaced around 10,000 with around 600 structures in Knysna and Plettenberg Bay being destroyed.

The fires were notable for involving the largest deployment of firefighters in South Africa to that date.  A total of 985 firefighters along with 78 vehicles, ten helicopters, and two fixed winged aircraft were used in combating the fire between 6 June and 10 June 2017. It is estimated that the fires caused between R4 billion and R5 billion (around US$297 million to US$372 million) in damages to private property with an additional R136 million worth of damage done to public infrastructure.

Unofficial preliminary conjecture suggested that some of the fires might have been lit by arsonists.

However, it was later found that the fires started as a result of lightning. Forensic scientist Dr David Klatzow ruled out arson as the cause of the Knysna fires which killed seven people and left many homeless.

References 

2017 wildfires
Storms in South Africa
2017 in South Africa
June 2017 events in South Africa
Wildfires in South Africa
2017 disasters in South Africa
2017 fires in Africa